Edward Alston Cecil Baugh (born 10 January 1936) is a Jamaican poet and scholar, recognised as an authority on the work of Derek Walcott, whose Selected Poems (2007) Baugh edited, having in 1978 authored the first book-length study of the Nobel-winning poet's work, Derek Walcott: Memory as Vision.

Biography
Edward Baugh was born on 10 January 1936 in Port Antonio, Jamaica, the son of Edward Percival Baugh, purchasing agent, and Ethel Maud Duhaney-Baugh. He began writing poetry at Titchfield High School. He won a scholarship to study English literature at the University College of the West Indies and later did postgraduate studies at Queen's University in Ontario, Canada, and at the University of Manchester, where he earned a PhD in 1964.

He taught at the Cave Hill campus of the University of the West Indies from 1965 to 1967, then at the university's Mona campus from 1968 to 2001, eventually being appointed professor of English in 1978 and public orator in 1985. He has also held visiting appointments at the University of California, Dalhousie University, University of Hull, University of Wollongong, Flinders University, Macquarie University, University of Miami and Howard University.

In 2012 he was awarded a Gold Musgrave Medal by the Institute of Jamaica.

In March 2021 Baugh was announced as the co-recipient, together with Mervyn Morris, of the 2021 Bocas Henry Swanzy Award.

Scholarly works

His scholarly publications include West Indian Poetry 1900–1970: A Study in Cultural Decolonisation (1971); Critics on Caribbean Literature (1978); Derek Walcott: Memory as Vision (1978), the first book-length study of Walcott's work; and an annotated edition of Walcott's Another Life (2004), with Colbert Nepaulsingh. Chancellor, I Present (1998) collects a number of the addresses Baugh delivered as UWI's public orator on the occasion of the presentation on honorary degrees.

Poetry

Baugh's poems appeared in various magazines and anthologies years before the publication of his first collection, A Tale from the Rainforest (1988). This was followed by It Was the Singing (2000) and Black Sand: New and Selected Poems (2013).

Selected bibliography
 Black Sand: New and Selected Poems (2013) 
 It Was the Singing (2000) 
 I Was a Teacher Too (1991) 
 A Tale from the Rainforest (1988) 
 Derek Walcott: Memory as Vision: "Another Life" (1978) 
 Critics on Caribbean Literature (1978)
 West Indian Poetry 1900–1970: A Study in Cultural Decolonisation (1971)

References

External links
 "Interview with Jamaican poet, Edward Baugh", Commonwealth Writers. 21 April 2012.
 .

20th-century Jamaican poets
Jamaican male poets
1936 births
Living people
Alumni of University of London Worldwide
Alumni of the University of London
University of the West Indies alumni
Jamaican academics
University of the West Indies academics
Jamaican literary critics
Recipients of the Musgrave Medal
21st-century Jamaican poets
20th-century male writers
21st-century male writers
People from Port Antonio